Sofia University Mountains (планина Софийски Университет \pla-ni-'na so-'fiy-ski u-ni-ver-si-'tet\) are a cluster of four small mountains,  long in the southwest-northeast direction and  wide, rising to ca.  (Mount Kliment Ohridski) in northern Alexander Island.

Bounded by Palestrina Glacier to the north, Nichols Snowfield to the southeast, and McManus Glacier to the west. The mountains comprise Mount Braun to the northwest, Balan Ridge to the north and Landers Peaks to the northeast, and the ridge of Mount Kliment Ohridski to the south.
 
The name is of national culture and was given in commemoration of the centennial of Sofia University. During the first Bulgarian Antarctic campaign organized on that occasion, the southeast edge of Sofia University Mountains and foothills of neighbouring Rouen Mountains and Elgar Uplands were visited in February 1988 by a field party including two members of the British Antarctic Survey, geologist Philip Nell and mountain guide and physician Peter Marquis, and two Bulgarian geologists, Christo Pimpirev and Borislav Kamenov.

Location
They were seen from the air and roughly mapped by the 1936-37 British Graham Land Expedition with more detailed British mapping in 1960 from air photos taken by the 1947-48 US Expedition under Ronne.

Maps
 British Antarctic Territory. Scale 1:200000 topographic map. DOS 610 – W 69 70. Tolworth, UK, 1971
 Antarctic Digital Database (ADD). Scale 1:250000 topographic map of Antarctica. Scientific Committee on Antarctic Research (SCAR). Since 1993, regularly upgraded and updated

References
 Bulgarian Antarctic Gazetteer. Antarctic Place-names Commission. (details in Bulgarian, basic data in English)
 Sofia University Mountains. SCAR Composite Gazetteer of Antarctica.

External links
 Sofia University Mountains. Copernix satellite image

Mountain ranges of Alexander Island